Caleb Brandon Wilson (born July 15, 1996) is an American football tight end who is a free agent. He played college football at UCLA and was selected by the Arizona Cardinals with the final pick of the 2019 NFL Draft, making him that draft's Mr. Irrelevant. He has also been a member of the Philadelphia Eagles.

College career
Wilson originally committed to play football at Old Dominion as a quarterback, but later joined USC as a walk-on tight end so he could play for his father, and took a redshirt year. After his redshirt year during which his father was fired, Wilson transferred to UCLA. Wilson played in all 12 games during his first year. In the season opener in his second year in 2017, Wilson had 15 receptions for 203 yards to help lead the Bruins to a school-record 34-point comeback in a 45–44 win over Texas A&M.
His season ended prematurely after five starts when he injured his foot against Colorado.

As a junior in 2018, Wilson had a season-high 184 yards in the season finale against Stanford, and finished the year with UCLA single-season records for a tight end with 60 receptions and 965 receiving yards. He led all tight ends in the NCAA Division I Football Bowl Subdivision in receptions per game (5.0), receiving yards per game (80.4) and receiving yards. Wilson was voted a second-team All-American by Sporting News, and was named first-team All-Pac-12, the only first-team selection for the Bruins, who finished the season with a 3–9 record. On December 6, 2018, Wilson announced that he would forgo his final year of eligibility to declare for the 2019 NFL Draft.

Professional career

Arizona Cardinals
Wilson was selected by the Arizona Cardinals in the seventh round (254th overall) of the 2019 NFL Draft, earning him the title Mr. Irrelevant as the final pick in the draft. He was waived on August 31, 2019, but the Cardinals re-signed him to their practice squad the next day.

Washington Redskins
On December 13, 2019, Wilson was signed off the Cardinals' practice squad to the active roster of the Washington Redskins. He was waived on August 3, 2020.

Philadelphia Eagles
Wilson was claimed off waivers by the Philadelphia Eagles on August 4, 2020. He was waived on September 4, 2020, and re-signed to the practice squad two days later. He was elevated to the active roster on November 14, November 21, and November 30 for the team's weeks 10, 11, and 12 games against the New York Giants, Cleveland Browns, and Seattle Seahawks, and reverted to the practice squad after each game. He was signed to the active roster on December 26, 2020. He was waived on August 14, 2021.

Washington Football Team
Wilson was claimed off waivers by the Washington Football Team on August 15, 2021. He was waived on August 31, 2021.

Denver Broncos
On November 3, 2021, Wilson was signed to the Denver Broncos practice squad. He was released on November 9. He was re-signed on December 21. His contract expired when the team's season ended on January 8, 2022.

Personal life
Wilson is the son of Chris Wilson, who was selected by the Chicago Bears in the 12th round of the 1992 NFL Draft. Chris was also a member of the USC coaching staff while Caleb was a player.

References

External links

UCLA Bruins bio

1996 births
Living people
People from Gardena, California
Players of American football from Dallas
Sportspeople from Los Angeles County, California
Players of American football from California
American football tight ends
UCLA Bruins football players
Arizona Cardinals players
Washington Redskins players
Washington Football Team players
Philadelphia Eagles players
Denver Broncos players